is a 2009 Japanese super historical drama television series, and the 48th taiga drama of NHK. It aired every Sunday from January 4 to November 22, 2009, spanning 47 episodes. The drama centers on the life of 16th century samurai Naoe Kanetsugu, played by Satoshi Tsumabuki.

Production began on April 27, 2007. The drama is based on the novel of the same name by Masashi Hisaka and was adapted by Eriko Komatsu, with Michiru Ōshima as series composer. The fourth episode of the series, is the highest-rated episode of any Japanese drama in 2009.

Plot
The protagonist of the drama, Naoe Kanetsugu, was taught by Uesugi Kenshin in his youth that to conquer the world is a trifling matter, but what matters is to live one's life with righteousness. After Uesugi's death, Naoe supports Uesugi Kagekatsu, who holds the destiny of Echigo province.

Production

Production Credits

Script – Eriko Komatsu, Kazue Matsushita
Based on the novel by – Masashi Hisaka
Narrator – Nobuko Miyamoto
Music – Michiru Ōshima
Historical research – Tetsuo Owada
Action director – Kunishirō Hayashi
Architectural research – Sei Hirai
Clothing research – Kiyoko Koizumi
Titling – Sōun Takeda
Production coordinator – Shinsuke Naitō
Casting – Yōichirō Takahashi

Production for Tenchijin began on April 27, 2007. The usual taiga drama production would have one-third of the expected number of scripts finished before shooting begins. Afterwards, audience reception is taken into account as the rest of the series is written.

Cast

Starring role
Satoshi Tsumabuki as Naoe Kanetsugu - born as Yoroku, then renamed as Higuchi Kanetsugu
Seishiro Kato as Higuchi Yoroku (childhood Kanetsugu)

Naoe house
Takako Tokiwa as Osen
Michiko Kichise as Oyū - Osen's elder sister
Joe Shishido as Naoe Kagetsuna
Shinji Yamashita as Naoe Nobutsuna - Osen's first husband
Hisako Manda as Oman - Osen's mother
Seishiro Kato as Naoe Kanematsu (childhood Naoe Kaneaki - Kanetsugu's son - double role)

Higuchi house
Masanobu Takashima as Higuchi Sōemon - Kanetsugu's father
Misako Tanaka as Ofuji - Kanetsugu's mother.
Kotaro Koizumi as Ōkuni Saneyori - Kanetsugu's younger brother
Homare Mabuchi as Higuchi Yoshichi (childhood Saneyori)
Miro Ebato as Kita - Kanetsugu's sister

Uesugi clan
Kazuki Kitamura as Uesugi Kagekatsu
Tetsuji Tamayama as Uesugi Kagetora
Hiroshi Abe as Uesugi Kenshin - foster father of Kagekatsu and Kagetora
Saki Aibu as Hanahime
Manami Higa as Kikuhime
Reiko Takashima as Sentōin
Jin Maki as Usami Sadamitsu

Uesugi retainers and their family members
Mikihisa Azuma as Izumisawa Hisahide
Sei Hiraizumi as Kuribayashi Masayori
Masayuki Suzuki as Fukazawa Toshishige
Shingo Katsurayama as Abe Masayoshi
Papaya Suzuki as Noborisaka Tōemon
Satoru Matsuo as Sakurai Haruyoshi
Minoru Matsumoto as Fukazawa Yashichirō
Yasuhiro Arai as Kitajō Takahiro
Kunishirō Hayashi as Kamiizumi Hidetsuna
Kei Yamamoto as Yoshie Munenobu
Nobuaki Kakuda as Kakizaki Haruie
Takejō Aki as Kayo
Shunsuke Sugiyama as Nishiyama Kanzaemon
Takeshi Katō as Hokkō Zenshuku, a Zen priest, master of young Yoroku (Kanetsugu) and Kiheiji (Kagekatsu)

Oda clan
Kōji Kikkawa as Oda Nobunaga
Shingo Tsurumi as Akechi Mitsuhide
Shun Sugata as Shibata Katsuie

Toyotomi clan
Takashi Sasano as Toyotomi Hideyoshi
Sumiko Fuji as Nene
Shun Oguri as Ishida Mitsunari
Kyōko Fukada as Yodo
Hidekazu Mashima as Toyotomi Hidetsugu
Go Wakabayashi as Shima Sakon
Yoshizumi Ishihara as Fukushima Masanori
Takamasa Suga as Ukita Hideie
Hisayuki Nakajima as Asano Nagamasa
Tsutomu Takahashi as Katō Kiyomasa
Ryuhei Numata as Mashita Nagamori
Tatsuhiro Yanase as Maeda Gen'i
Tomoya Nakamura as Toyotomi Hideyori
Umika Kawashima as Senhime (Ep. 46)
Momoko Tanabe as young senhime (Ep. 45)
Masayuki Kikuchi as Natsuka Masaie
Kanji Tsuda as Ōtani Yoshitsugu
Hiroshi Yamada as Konishi Yukinaga

Tokugawa clan
Hiroki Matsukata as Tokugawa Ieyasu
Akinori Nakagawa as Tokugawa Hidetada
Seiji Matsuyama as Honda Masanobu
Taro Kawano as Sakakibara Yasumasa
Masato Nagamori as Ii Naomasa
Daisuke Iijima as Sakai Tadatsugu
Ippei Kanie as Honda Masazumi
Masaya Kikawada as Honda Masashige
Yukijiro Hotaru as Tōyama Yasumitsu
Atsuko Hirata as Asahi no kata

Mōri clan
Akira Nakao as Mōri Terumoto
Takahiro Mizuma as Mōri Hidemoto
Tadashi Yokouchi as Kobayakawa Takakage
Yūsuke Kamiji as Kobayakawa Hideaki

Maeda clan
Ken Utsui as Maeda Toshiie
Onoe Matsuya II as Maeda Toshinaga

Takeda clan
Ichikawa Emiya II as Takeda Katsuyori
Shun Ōide as Kōsaka Masanobu

Later Hōjō clan
Goro Ibuki as Hōjō Ujimasa
Yu Kamiki as Hōjō Ujinao
Isao Sasaki as Daidōji Masashige

Date clan
Ryuhei Matsuda as Date Masamune
Anne Watanabe as Princess Mego - Date Masamune's wife
Yuta Sone as Katakura Kagetsuna

Sanada clan
Yū Shirota as Sanada Yukimura
Ryo Iwamatsu as Sanada Masayuki
Masami Nagasawa as Hatsune - Sanada Yukimura's older sister.
Yuji Shirakura as Sarutobi Sasuke - a fictional ninja.

Chōsokabe clan
Seiichi Kawano as Chōsokabe Morichika

Other
Shigeru Kōyama as Sen no Rikyū
Yoshino Kimura as Oryō, Rikyū's daughter

TV schedule

Soundtrack and books

Soundtrack
NHK Taiga Drama Tenchijin Original Soundtrack Vol.1 (February 18, 2009)
NHK Taiga Drama Tenchijin Original Soundtrack Vol.2 (August 26, 2009)
NHK Taiga Drama Tenchijin Original Soundtrack Vol.3 (October 21, 2009)

Books
Official guide
NHK Taiga Drama Story Tenchijin First Part  (December 20, 2008)
NHK Taiga Drama Story Tenchijin Latter Part  (July 10, 2009)
NHK Taiga Drama Story Tenchijin Last Part  (October 24, 2009)
NHK Taiga Drama, Historical Handbook, Tenchijin  (December 20, 2008)
Sōun Takeda - Writing about Samurai  (September 30, 2009)
Novel
Tenchijin First Volume  (September 26, 2009)
Tenchijin Last Volume  (September 26, 2009)
Tenchijin, New Edition, First Volume  (November 14, 2008)
Tenchijin, New Edition, Latter Volume  (November 14, 2008)
Tenchijin, New Edition, Last Volume  (November 14, 2008)

Notes

References

External links

NHK website

Taiga drama
2009 Japanese television series debuts
2009 Japanese television series endings
Jidaigeki
Television shows based on Japanese novels
Television series set in the 16th century
Television series set in the 17th century
Cultural depictions of Uesugi Kenshin
Cultural depictions of Akechi Mitsuhide
Cultural depictions of Oda Nobunaga
Cultural depictions of Toyotomi Hideyoshi
Cultural depictions of Tokugawa Ieyasu
Cultural depictions of Date Masamune
Cultural depictions of Sanada clan
Television shows set in Niigata Prefecture
Television shows set in Yamagata Prefecture
Television shows set in Fukushima Prefecture